Psara cryptolepis is a moth in the family Crambidae. It was described by Edward L. Martin in 1956. It is found in Burundi, Ethiopia and Uganda.

References

Spilomelinae
Moths described in 1956
Moths of Africa